Estoloides pararufipes is a species of beetle in the family Cerambycidae. It was described by Stephan von Breuning in 1974. It is known from Belize.

References

Estoloides
Beetles described in 1974